Zindagi Ek Juaa is a 1992 Hindi tragedy drama film directed and produced by Prakash Mehra. It stars Anil Kapoor, Madhuri Dixit, Shakti Kapoor, Suresh Oberoi, Anupam Kher, Amrish Puri in pivotal roles. The music was composed by Bappi Lahiri.

Synopsis 
After saving the life of his employer, Jagjeet Singh, alias J.J., Harikishan, alias Hariya is promoted with a wage increase that he had only dreamt of. Anxious to please his employer, Hariya agrees to have his name changed to Harry and does anything that he is instructed to do. Soon Harry realises that he has been aiding his employer in illegal activities. When he tries to break away, he is told that his mother and sister are and will be held captive to guarantee his cooperation. Harry must now come up with a scheme that will guarantee his safety as well as the freedom of his mother and sister, and at the same time save himself from being arrested by the police.

Cast 
 Anil Kapoor as Harikishan "Hariya" / Harry 
 Madhuri Dixit as Juhi 
 Shakti Kapoor as Shakti 
 Suresh Oberoi as CBI Officer Suresh Chandra Bhatnagar
 Anupam Kher as Jagjeet Singh "J.J." 
 Amrish Puri as Bhalla
 Mangal Dhillon as Mangal  
 Anant Jog as Lobo 
 Roma Manek as Dancer in Shakti Dancing Group
 Asha Sharma as Harikishan's Mother

Soundtrack

External links 
 
 Movietalkies

1992 films
1992 drama films
1990s Hindi-language films
Films directed by Prakash Mehra
Films scored by Bappi Lahiri